William Mackey Cruikshank (7 November 1870 – 23 February 1943) was a United States army officer. He mainly served with the United States artillery and participated in military conflicts during the Spanish–American War and World War I.

Early life and education 
Cruikshank was born in Washington, D.C. on 7 November 1870 to John C. Cruikshank and Euphrasia Antisell. He attended the United States Military Academy at West Point, where he was a classmate of future Chief of Cavalry Herbert Ball Crosby, and graduated in 1893. Later in 1903, Cruikshank graduated from the School of Submarine Defense at Willet's Point, New York. He also graduated from the Army War College in 1920.

Military career 

After graduating, Cruikshank was commissioned as second lieutenant in the 2nd Artillery on June 12, 1893. He taught mathematics at West Point from 1895 until 1898, when he took part in the Santiago Campaign of the Spanish–American War, after which returned to teaching from 1898–1899. Cruikshank was later stationed as artillery engineer at Fort Howard in Maryland from 1904–1907, until he went to the Philippines to serve as adjutant of the 5th Field Artillery from 1907–1909.

Shortly after the American entry into World War I in April 1917, Cruikshank was promoted to colonel on May 15. He arrived in France with the 1st Division, where he commanded their field artillery regiment. He served in this capacity until 1918, when he was promoted to brigadier general of the National Army. He then commanded the 3rd Field Artillery of the 3rd Division. Later that same year, Cruikshank also served with the 4th Corps of the American Expeditionary Forces as Chief of Artillery.

After the end of the war, Cruikshank remained in Europe as part of the occupation forces in Germany until 1919. For his service during the war in Europe, Cruikshank received the Distinguished Service Medal from the United States and the Legion of Honor from France. The citation for his Army DSM reads:

After his return to the United States, he served on the General Staff Corps from 1920–1924. Later Cruikshank was commandant at the Field Artillery School at Fort Sill, Oklahoma from 1930 until his retirement on 30 November 1934.

Personal life and death 
On April 30, 1904, Cruikshank married Cornelia Baird Holabird, the granddaughter of General Samuel B. Holabird and daughter of architect William Holabird.  They were the parents of a daughter, Mary Holabird Cruikshank. He was an Episcopalian and member of the Military Order of the Loyal Legion. Cruikshank died on 23 February 1943 in Washington, D.C.

References 

United States Army generals of World War I
United States Military Academy alumni
Recipients of the Distinguished Service Medal (US Army)
1870 births
1943 deaths
American military personnel of the Spanish–American War
Military personnel from Washington, D.C.
Recipients of the Legion of Honour
United States Army War College alumni
American expatriates in the Philippines
American expatriates in France
American expatriates in Germany
United States Army generals
United States Military Academy faculty